Šošůvka is a municipality and village in Blansko District in the South Moravian Region of the Czech Republic. It has about 700 inhabitants.

Geography
It lies in the Drahany Highlands.

Šošůvka lies on the northern border of the Moravian Karst Protected Landscape Area. Part of the nature reserve Sloupsko-šošůvské jeskyně ("Sloup-Šošůvka Caves") is located in the municipality.

History
The first written mention of Šošůvka is from 1374.

References

Villages in Blansko District